Siuatonga Likiliki (born 10 April 1990), also known by the nickname of "Tonga",  is a Tonga international rugby league footballer who plays as a  and er for the Burleigh Bears in the Queensland Cup. He previously played for the New Zealand Warriors and Newcastle Knights in the NRL.

Background
Born in Auckland, New Zealand, Likiliki is of Tongan descent and played his junior football for the Marist Saints in the Auckland Rugby League competition, while attending Mount Albert Grammar School, and the Auckland Lions in the Bartercard Cup. He was then signed by the New Zealand Warriors.

Playing career
From 2008 to 2010, Likiliki played for the New Zealand Warriors' NYC team, scoring 29 tries in 50 games.
In Round 23 of the 2009 NRL season Likiliki made his NRL debut for the Warriors against Parramatta. 

Likiliki became the eighth player to be promoted to the Warriors first-grade team from the under-20s squad since the competition began in 2008.
In October 2009, Likiliki played for Tonga against the New Zealand national rugby league team during a one-off test. He played 2 more games for Tonga in the 2009 Pacific Cup.

In June 2010, Likiliki signed a two-year contract with the Newcastle Knights starting in 2011.
On 3 October 2010, Likiliki scored a try in the Warriors' win over South Sydney in the 2010 NYC Grand Final, which was his last game for the Warriors.
In October 2010, Likiliki was selected for the Junior Kiwis to play the Junior Kangaroos.
Likiliki made his debut for the Newcastle side in Round 25 of the 2011 NRL season after regular centre Adam MacDougall was ruled out with injury.

In 2013, Likiliki played for Tonga against fierce Pacific rivals Samoa in the Pacific Rugby League International that was played at Penrith Stadium in Penrith, New South Wales, Australia. He scored 2 tries in Tonga's 36-4 win over Samoa. Later in the year, Likiliki played in Tonga's unsuccessful 2013 Rugby League World Cup campaign. He only made 1 appearance, and that was coming off the bench against Italy.
On 14 August 2013, Likiliki signed a one-year contract with the Gold Coast Titans starting in 2014. He failed to make a first-grade appearance in 2014 and was released by the Titans at the end of the year, joining the Burleigh Bears in 2015.

References

External links

2013 Newcastle Knights profile

1990 births
Living people
Burleigh Bears players
Central Coast Centurions players
New Zealand rugby league players
New Zealand sportspeople of Tongan descent
New Zealand Warriors players
Newcastle Knights players
Marist Saints players
Junior Kiwis players
Rugby league centres
Rugby league players from Auckland
Rugby league wingers
People educated at Mount Albert Grammar School
Tonga national rugby league team players